The rivalry between Persepolis and Tractor is a footballing rivalry played between Iranian clubs Persepolis and Tractor.

History

Tractor return to first tier and Navad TV show

This rivalry started in 2009 when Tractor returned to first tier of Iranian football league after 8 years and their fans had passion about this event. For the first time, a club except Esteghlal and Persepolis had too much fans in many of Iran's stadiums including Azadi, Esteghlal and Persepolis home ground. Their passion was so great that the Navad TV show arranged a vote quiz about the hottest fans in Iran and Tractor became first. Their coach Faraz Kamalvand declared on that program "Our fans are most popular fans in Iran too." This caused on other night Navad program arranged a vote quiz about the most popular fans in Iran and Tractor became third after Persepolis and Esteghlal. their fans didn't accept this result and protested and also looked Esteghlal and Persepolis as a Rival. On the other hand, with Tractor getting stronger, the rivalry between them and Tehran giants became more intense and Tractor won many times in Azadi stadium, especially against Esteghlal. In the years after that this rivalry was a bit overwhelmed by violence from both fans.

All results

Summary of results

Trophies

Top goal scorers
 Player in Italic is still active in football playing.
 Player in bold is still active for Persepolis or Tractor.

1 Seyed-Salehi scored 2 goals as the Tractor player and 1 goal as the Persepolis player.

 Own goals
  Afshin Peyrovani (against Tractor)
  Sosha Makani (against Tractor)

Hat-tricks 
 
A hat-trick is achieved when the same player scores three or more goals in one match. Listed in chronological order.

Most successful coaches
 Coaches in bold are still active for Persepolis or Tractor.

See also
 Football in Iran
 Persepolis F.C.
 Tractor S.C.
 Tehran Derby
 El Gilano
 Isfahan Derby
 Mashhad Derby
 Persepolis F.C.–Sepahan S.C. rivalry
 Esteghlal F.C.–Sepahan S.C. rivalry
 Major football rivalries

References

Football derbies in Iran
rivalry
Tractor S.C.
Persepolis F.C. matches